Hayes Branch is a stream in Barry County in the U.S. state of Missouri.

Hayes Branch has the name of the local Hayes family.

See also
List of rivers of Missouri

References

Rivers of Barry County, Missouri
Rivers of Missouri